A nanotube is a nanometer-scale hollow tube-like structure.

Kinds of nanotubes
 BCN nanotube, composed of comparable amounts of boron, carbon, and nitrogen atoms
 Boron nitride nanotube, a polymorph of boron nitride
 Carbon nanotube, includes general nanotube terminology and diagrams
 DNA nanotube, a two-dimensional lattice which curves back upon itself, somewhat similar in size and shape to a carbon nanotube
 Gallium nitride nanotube, a nanotube of gallium nitride
 Silicon nanotube, made of silicon atoms
 Non-carbon nanotube, especially tungsten(IV) sulfide nanotubes
 Tunneling nanotube, a tubular membrane connection between cells
 Titanium nanotubes, created by the conversion of the mineral anatase by hydrothermal synthesis

References